The following is a list of notable alumni of Loomis Chaffee School.  Also called LC or Loomis, the Loomis Chaffee School is a college preparatory school located in Windsor, Connecticut.



A
 John Ashmead 1934 – writer, educator, author of The Mountain and the Feather, writer for The Atlantic, book reviewer for The Philadelphia Bulletin

B
 Deborah Baker 1977 – biographer and essayist known for A Blue Hand: The Beats in India, a biography of Allen Ginsberg that focuses on his time in India.
 Stephen R. Barnett – American legal scholar
 Peter Barton 1969 – British military historian, author and filmmaker specialising in trench warfare during World War I.
 Jerome Beatty Jr. 1935 –  twentieth-century American author of children's literature. He was also an accomplished feature writer for magazines.
 Andrew Berenzweig 1995 – professional ice hockey player, Nashville Predators
 Gerald Warner Brace 1918 – writer, educator, sailor, and boat builder
Peter C. Brinckerhoff 1970 – writer, educator of nonprofits
 Mark Brown 1977 – Major League Baseball pitcher for the Baltimore Orioles (1984) and Minnesota Twins (1985)
 Harry G. Broadman 1973 – foreign trade and investment negotiator, global business growth strategist, corporate director, private equity investor, economist, litigation dispute expert, author and journalist.
 Frank Bruni 1982 – reporter, food critic, and columnist, The New York Times; author of Ambling into History: The Unlikely Odyssey of George W. Bush
Miriam Butterworth 1936 – American educator, activist, and politician who fought for equal representation in the Connecticut General Assembly.

C
 Jesse Camp 1997 – video jockey, media personality
 David E. Cane 1962 – American biological chemist serving as the Vernon K. Krieble Professor of Chemistry Emeritus and Professor of Molecular Biology, Cell Biology, and Biochemistry Emeritus at Brown University.
 Richard Adams Carey 1969 – American writer best known for Against the Tide: The Fate of the New England Fisherman. 
 Jonathan Carroll 1967 – author of The Land of Laughs, Voice of Our Shadow, Bones of the Moon, A Child Across the Sky, Black Cocktail, Sleeping in Flame, Outside the Dog Museum, After Silence, From the Teeth of Angels
 John Chamberlain 1920 – was an American journalist, business and economic historian, syndicated columnist and literary critic.
 Benjamin Cheever 1967 – author of The Plagiarist, The Partisan, Famous After Death
 Pauline Chen 1982 – surgeon, author, and The New York Times columnist
 Aaron Civale 2013 – American professional baseball pitcher for the Cleveland Guardians of the MLB.
 Chris Cillizza 1994 – political journalist at CNN and author 
 Larry Collins 1947 – author of Is Paris Burning?
 Nancy W. Collins 1991 – Columbia University professor
Neal Conan – American radio journalist, producer, editor, and correspondent who worked for National Public Radio and hosted Talk the Nation.
 Alfred V. Covello 1950 – Senior United States district judge of the United States District Court for the District of Connecticut, Former Connecticut Supreme Court Justice.
 Alexander M. Cutler 1969 – former chairman and CEO of an American multinational power management company known as the Eaton Corporation.

D
 Bianca D'Agostino 2007 – soccer player for the Boston Breakers
 Adam Davies 1990 – American author known for The Frog King.
 Bob Davis – Major League Baseball pitcher
 Ruthie Davis 1980 – founder, designer, and president of luxury shoe brand Ruthie Davis
 Myron "Moe" W. Drabowsky 1953 – Major League Baseball player with the Baltimore Orioles and other teams
 Guilford Dudley Jr. 1925 – United States Ambassador to Denmark

E
 David Edelstein 1977 – film critic for New York Magazine, NPR's Fresh Air, CBS Sunday Morning, Slate, the New York Post, the Village Voice, and the Boston Phoenix
 Warren William Eginton 1941 – Senior United States district judge of the United States District Court for the District of Connecticut
 Alexander Eliot 1936 – American writer who served as art editor for Time Magazine. He was best known for his works on spirituality and myth.
 James F. English Jr. 1944 — former bank executive and President of Trinity College. 
 Lord David Ennals (one-year student) –  British Labour Party politician and campaigner for human rights who served as Secretary of State for Social Services from 1976 to 1979.

F
Scott Fankhouser 1994 – former American ice hockey goaltender who used to be the Assistant Coach for the Cincinnati Cyclones. He is currently the assistant manager of Swonder Ice Arena in Evansville Indiana.
 Diana Farrell 1983 – Founding President and CEO of the JPMorgan Chase Institute, member of the Council on Foreign Relations, and Deputy Assistant on Economic Policy to President Barack Obama

G
 Betty Gilpin 2004 – Emmy-nominated American actress known for her performances in the Netflix comedy series GLOW and Nurse Jackie.  
 Pete Grannis 1960 – former Commissioner of the New York State Department of Environmental Conservation and member of the New York State Assembly.
 Ella T. Grasso 1936 – first woman elected Governor of Connecticut and the first woman elected governor of any US state without following her husband.
 Jack Gould (1914–1993) – influential television and radio critic and reporter for The New York Times from 1944 to 1972.

H
 John A. Hall 1964 – Professor of Comparative Historical Sociology at McGill University
 Benjamin Hedges 1926 – Olympic track and field athlete (1928)
 Chris Hedges 1975 – Fellow at Nation Institute; professor at Princeton University; author of War Is a Force That Gives Us Meaning; former Middle East Bureau Chief for The New York Times; former correspondent, National Public Radio; member of team winning 2002 Pulitzer Prize for explanatory journalism; 2002 Amnesty International Global Award for Human Rights Journalism
Liana Hinds 2011 – American-born Trinidadian footballer who plays as a defender for Swedish club Sundsvalls DFF and the Trinidad and Tobago women's national team.
 Allan Hobson 1951 – American psychiatrist, dream researcher, and Professor of Psychiatry, Emeritus, at Harvard Medical School who is known for his research on rapid eye movement sleep.
 Henry R. Horsey 1943 – Delaware Supreme Court justice
 Sirena Huang 2012 – Taiwanese American concert violinist
Morris N. Hughes, Jr. 1963 – American Career Foreign Service Officer who served as the United States Ambassador to Burundi

I
 Robert Grant Irving 1958 – author of Indian Summer

K
Charles Kaiser 1968 – American author, journalist, and acting director of the LGBTQ Public Policy Center at Hunter College.
 David E. Kaiser 1965 – professor of history, Naval War College, Newport, Rhode Island; author of American Tragedy, Politics and War: European Conflict from Philip II to Hitler, and Epic Season: The 1948 American League Pennant Race
 Robert G. Kaiser 1960 – managing editor of and associate editor and senior correspondent for The Washington Post; author of "Russia from the Inside" and "Act of Congress: How America's Essential Institution Works, and How It Doesn't".
Ray Kidder 1941 – American physicist and nuclear weapons designer
 Henry R. Kravis 1963 – billionaire, founding partner of Kohlberg Kravis Roberts & Co.
 Corby Kummer 1974 – restaurant critic for Boston magazine and editor at The Atlantic magazine
 Alexander Kuo 1957 – American teacher, poet, fiction writer, and essayist who served as Professor of English at Washington State University.
 Joshua Kurlantzick 1994 – American Journalist and Fellow for Southeast Asia at the Council on Foreign Relations.

L
 Pete Larson 1962 – former American football Running back for the Washington Redskins
Neil Lebhar 1968 – American Anglican Bishop who served as the first bishop of the Gulf Atlantic Diocese
 Tom Lehrer 1943 – musical satirist, entertainer, and mathematician
 Nicholas M. Loeb – businessman and son of John Langeloth Loeb, Jr.
 Tony Lupien 1935 – American first baseman in Major League Baseball. He was a left-handed batter who played for the Boston Red Sox, Philadelphia Phillies, and Chicago White Sox, grandfather of John Cena.

M
 David Margolick 1970 – Contributing Editor, Vanity Fair; National Legal Affairs Correspondent, The New York Times; author of At the Bar, Undue Influence: The Epic Battle for the Johnson & Johnson Fortune, Strange Fruit: The Biography of a Song, Beyond Glory: Joe Louis vs. Max Schmeling and a World on the Brink
 Andrea McCarren 1981 – television journalist and educator
Taylor Mead 1942 – American writer, actor, and performer known for his appearances in Andy Warhol's underground films. 
 Terry Melcher – musician, songwriter ("Kokomo") and producer, The Beach Boys and The Byrds; son of Doris Day
Nana Mensah 2001 — American actress, writer, and director.
 Geoff Muldaur 1961 – American singer, songwriter, solo guitarist and a founding member of the Jim Kweskin Jug Band.
 Matthew M. Murray 1989 – Major League Baseball pitcher, Boston Red Sox (1995)
 John Garvan Murtha 1959 – Senior United States district judge of the United States District Court for the District of Vermont.

N
John Nichols 1958 – American Novelist known for the New Mexico trilogy
Charles Hollister Noble – American historical novelist and screenwriter

O
John Peter Oleson 1964 – Canadian classical archaeologist and historian of ancient technology
Richard Ottinger 1946 – American legal educator and politician from New York who served in the United States House of Representatives for eight terms.

P
David Park – American painter and a pioneer of the Bay Area Figurative Movement in painting during the 1950s.
Richard Plepler 1977 – former chairman and CEO of HBO.
J.J. Philbin 1992 - American producer and screenwriter known for her work on The O.C.

Q

R
 David M. Raup 1950 – University of Chicago Paleontologist.
 Betsy Reed 1986 – journalist and editor-in-chief of The Intercept and editor of The Nation.
 Howie Richmond 1935 –  American music publisher and music industry executive.
 Richard Rifkind 1948 – American Cancer Researcher who served as chairman and Chief Scientific Officer of the Sloan Kettering Institute.  
 Thomas D. Ritter 1970 – lawyer, lobbyist, and retired politician from Connecticut who was the Speaker of the Connecticut House of Representatives
Selden Rodman 1927 – prolific U.S. writer of poetry, plays and prose, political commentary, art criticism, Latin American and Caribbean history, biography and travel writing.
 Adam Rome 1976 – American environmental historian who teaches environmental history and environmental non-fiction at the University at Buffalo.
 John D. Rockefeller III 1925 – philanthropist
Winthrop Rockefeller 1931 – first Republican Governor of Arkansas

S
 Keith Scribner 1980 – American novelist, short-story writer, screenwriter, essayist, and educator.
Richard Scudder 1931 – American newspaper pioneer, newspaper publisher, journalist, and co-founder of the MediaNews Group.
 Edward H. Shortliffe 1965 – biomedical informatician, physician, and computer scientist who pioneered the use of artificial intelligence in medicine.
 George P. Shultz 1938 – former United States Secretary of State
* George Selden 1947 – author of The Cricket in Times Square and other children's classics
Joyce Sidman 1974 – American children's writer
R. Peter Straus 1940 – American media Proprietor who served as president of WMCA and chairman of Strauss News, member of the Sulzberger Family.
 Steven Strogatz 1976 – Professor of Applied Mathematics, Cornell University, recipient of Presidential Young Investigator Award, author of SYNC: The Emerging Science of Spontaneous Order, math blogger for The New York Times (2010)
 John Chabot Smith 1932 – American journalist with the Washington Post, White House correspondent, and author of Alger Hiss: The True Story, an account sympathetic to Hiss.
Lyman Maynard Stowe 1930 – American physician and the first dean of the University of Connecticut School of Medicine.
 Arthur Ochs Sulzberger 1945 – chairman and publisher of The New York Times

T
 John Terry 1968 – film and television actor, Against the Grain, A Dangerous Woman, Iron Will, Lost
 Jeremiah Tower 1961 – celebrity chef credited with pioneering the culinary style known as California cuisine.
 James B. Twitchell 1962 – author and former professor of English at University of Florida

U
 Gretchen Ulion 1990 – Olympic gold medalist, U.S. Women's Olympic Hockey Team, Nagano, Japan 1998

V

W
 Katherine Waterston 1998 – actor Fantastic Beasts and Where to Find Them
 Geoffrey Wawro 1978 – Professor of Military History at the University of North Texas 
 Nancy Weber 1959 – American writer known primarily for The Life Swap
Benjamin C. Wedeman 1979 – American journalist and war correspondent
William Wemple 1930 – American lawyer who served in the United States Navy Reserve as a Lieutenant Commander and as General Counsel of the Navy
 Mike Whalen 1979 – athlete and coach for Williams College and Wesleyan University
 A.B.C. Whipple 1936 – journalist for Life magazine, author, and historian
 James Widdoes 1972 – film and television actor, director, and producer: Animal House (actor), Charles in Charge (actor), Night Court (actor), Dave's World (director/actor), My Wife and Kids (director/actor), 8 Simple Rules... For Dating My Teenage Daughter (director/producer), Two and a Half Men (director)
 David Wild 1980 – Senior Editor, Rolling Stone; host of Musicians (Bravo television)
 Robert Winters 1949 – President and CEO of The Prudential Insurance Company of America
 Jason Wu 2001 – fashion designer (designed First Lady Michelle Obama's inaugural ball gown and other pieces)

X

Y

Z
Drew Zingg 1973 – American rock, blues, soul and jazz guitarist, best known for his performing with Steely Dan and Boz Scaggs

Faculty
Eric Wollencott Barnes – American educator, diplomat, actor, and author.
 Kalena Bovell – American conductor who currently serves as assistant conductor of the Memphis Symphony Orchestra.
John Horne Burns – American writer who was best known for his novel The Gallery (1947). 
 Miriam Butterworth 1936 – American educator, activist, and politician who taught at Loomis Chaffee.
 Germaine Cheruy – French costume designer, artist, and intellectual. Madame Cheruy taught art programs at Loomis Chaffee.
 René Cheruy – French soldier, educator, and artist. He served as a French professor and French Department Head at Loomis Chaffee. During his time as a soldier he received the Legion of Honor.
William V. D'Antonio – Italian-American sociologist and educator.
 John W. Howe – American bishop of the Episcopal Diocese of Central Florida. He served as the Loomis School's chaplain.
Evelyn Beatrice Longman – American sculptor who married Headmaster Nathaniel Horton Batchelder and taught sculpting classes at the Loomis School.  
Vincent Schaefer – American chemist and meteorologist who developed cloud seeding. He was director of the Atmospheric Science Center at the Loomis School in Connecticut.

References

Lists of American people by school affiliation
Lists of people by educational affiliation in Connecticut